The W. H. Over Museum, in Vermillion, South Dakota is the oldest museum in the state of South Dakota. The museum is dedicated to preserving and displaying South Dakota cultural and historical objects. One of the objectives is to develop educational programs. Another objective is to maintain an inventory of research works and files.

History 
The museum was founded in 1883, established by the University of South Dakota. It is named for W. H. Over, who is credited or blamed for excavating the Ludlow Cave, an archeological site of great importance, probably the most significant in the state, which had a wealth of projectile points and much more.  It was excavated with poor methods, including possible accidental mixture of projectile points from other sites/cultures/eras into its collection. Between 1926 and 1948, the director of the museum was W. H. Over.

Collections 
The museum contains exhibits of archaeological artifacts; exhibits of geological objects, such as minerals and rocks; and exhibits on the different ethnic groups that inhabit South Dakota. The museum contains artifacts from the Lakota people. The museum also contains photographs of the Dakota Territory.

See also
Paleontology in South Dakota

References

External links
W. H. Over Museum, official site

Museums in Clay County, South Dakota
Buildings and structures in Vermillion, South Dakota
1883 establishments in Dakota Territory
University of South Dakota
History museums in South Dakota
Archaeological museums in South Dakota
University museums in South Dakota